A Land for All (Spanish:Tierra de todos) is a 1962 Spanish war film directed by Antonio Isasi-Isasmendi and starring Manuel Gallardo, Fernando Cebrián and Montserrat Julió.

Main cast
 Manuel Gallardo as Juan  
 Fernando Cebrián as Andrés  
 Montserrat Julió as Teresa  
 Amparo Baró as María  
 Lluís Torner as Pedro  
 Juan Lizárraga as Rafa  
 Fernando Repiso as Chico 
 María Zaldívar as Manuela  
 Antonio Andrada as Don Elías

References

Bibliography 
 Bentley, Bernard. A Companion to Spanish Cinema. Boydell & Brewer 2008.

External links 
 

1962 war films
Spanish war films
1962 films
1960s Spanish-language films
Films directed by Antonio Isasi-Isasmendi
1960s Spanish films